Pteronia spinulosa is a species of flowering plant in the family Asteraceae. It is found only in Namibia. Its natural habitat is rocky areas.

References

spinulosa
Flora of Namibia
Least concern plants
Taxonomy articles created by Polbot